Clinorhampha is a genus of flies in the family Empididae.

Species
C. inevoluta Collin, 1933
C. merita Collin, 1933
C. necopinata Collin, 1933

References

Empidoidea genera
Empididae